The 2010–11 Essex Senior Football League season was the 40th in the history of Essex Senior Football League a football competition in England. Enfield 1893 won the league, but were not promoted due to ground grading requirements. The League Cup was won by Stansted, and Burnham Ramblers won the Gordon Brasted Memorial Trophy.

League table

The league featured 17 clubs which competed in the league last season, no new clubs joined the league this season.

League table

Gordon Brasted Memorial Trophy

Round one
Bowers & Pitsea v Sawbridgeworth Town (Away Win awarded)

Round two
Basildon United 0-4 Eton Manor
Bethnal Green United 4-0 Sawbridgeworth Town
Burnham Ramblers 2-1 Enfield 1893
Hullbridge Sports 3-2 Stansted
Mauritius Sports 1-3 Barkingside
Southend Manor v London APSA (Away Win awarded)
Takeley 0-3 Clapton
Witham Town 3-2 Barking

Quarter-finals
Barkingside 2-1 Bethnal Green United
Burnham Ramblers 6-1 Clapton
Eton Manor 2-1 London APSA
Witham Town 3-1 Hullbridge Sports

Semi-finals
Eton Manor 2-1 Witham Town
Burnham Ramblers 4-2 Barkingside

Final
Burnham Ramblers 4-2 Eton Manor

References

Essex Senior Football League seasons
9